John Wilfred Barter (6 October 1917 – 17 December 1983) was a British Conservative Party politician.

He was Member of Parliament for Ealing North from the 1955 general election until the 1964 general election when he was defeated.

References 

1917 births
1983 deaths
Conservative Party (UK) MPs for English constituencies
UK MPs 1955–1959
UK MPs 1959–1964